Florence Laborderie (born 7 September 1969) is a former artistic gymnast. She competed at the 1984 Summer Olympics.

References

1969 births
Living people
French female artistic gymnasts
Gymnasts at the 1984 Summer Olympics
Olympic gymnasts of France
Place of birth missing (living people)
20th-century French women